Brian Herman Thomas Redman (born 9 March 1937 in Burnley, Lancashire and educated at Rossall School, Fleetwood, Lancashire), is a retired British racing driver.

Racing for Carl Haas and Jim Hall's Chaparral Cars, Brian Redman won the 1974, '75 and  '76 SCCA Formula 5000 series and has raced in nearly every category of racing, including Formula One. 
The Englishman began racing in 1959 and collected his first of four Manufacturers Championships in 1968, driving a Ford GT40 with Belgian Jacky Ickx for John Wyer Automotive Engineering. Redman 
also won the 1970/71 South African Springbok series and the IMSA Camel GTP Championship in 1981 driving a Lola T600.  Brian is considered to be one of the greatest endurance racers in the history
of the sport. In addition to his four victories at Spa-Francorchamps, Brian has overall wins in the 1970 Targa Florio, the Watkins Glen 6 Hours, the 12 Hours of Sebring twice, the Nurburgring 1000 Ks twice, 
Brands Hatch 6 Hours twice, Osterrechring 1000 Ks twice, Monza 1000 Ks twice, Kyalami 9 Hours twice, has been a two-time winner at the 24 Hours of Daytona and holds two class victories at Le Mans. 

He is currently a regular at the Monterey Historic Automobile Races at Mazda Raceway Laguna Seca.

Career
Redman raced F1 for McLaren, Shadow, Cooper, Williams

He participated in 15 World Championship Grands Prix, debuting on 1 January 1968. He achieved one podium in the 1968 Spanish Grand Prix, finishing third in a Cooper-BRM behind Graham Hill in a Lotus-Ford and Denny Hulme in a McLaren-Ford. He then had an accident at the Belgian Grand Prix at Spa-Francorchamps, crashing his Cooper-BRM when the suspension broke at the Les Coombes corner; he survived with a badly broken arm. He scored a total of 8 championship points in his career, with two 5th places in 1972, at the Monaco Grand Prix and the German Grand Prix driving a Yardley McLaren.

He achieved spectacular success in sports-car racing, particularly in 1968 as a John Wyer Gulf driver, in 1969 and 1970 as a Porsche works driver and in 1972 with the Ferrari 312 PB; Winning at Spa Francorchamps 1000 Ks 5 times, the Nurburgring 1000 Ks 3 times, Daytona 24 Hours 2 times, Sebring twice, Watkins Glen 6 Hours, Osterreichring twice, Monza 1000 Ks twice, the Targa Florio, Brands Hatch 6 Hours twice etc.   

In 1973 Redman started racing in the USA full-time and won the SCCA/USAC Formula 5000 Championship three times in a row from 1974 to 1976 driving a Jim Hall/Carl Haas Lola T330/332C against considerable opposition, including Mario Andretti and Al Unser, Jody Scheckter, Jackie Oliver, Alan Jones, David Hobbs, Brett Lunger, Sam Posey, "Vern" Schuppan et al. Redman was employed at Haas's  business office in Highland Park, Illinois, where he also lived for a time. At the end of 1976 the SCCA announced new rules. The F5000 single-seaters had to use full-width bodywork and the new series would be called Can-Am. On the first day of practice for the first race of the new season, at Circuit Mont-Tremblant, Canada the new car took off at 160 mph went 40 feet in the air and turned over, landing upside down. Redman suffered a broken neck (C1), fractured shoulder and sternum, plus bruising of the brain. The ambulance blew a tire on the way to hospital. Redman was declared dead. It took him 9 months to recover and he returned to racing on a spectacular note by winning the 12 Hours of Sebring in 1978 driving a Porsche 935. He continued driving for Dick Barbour Racing through 1979 and 1980. In 1981, driving the brand new Lolas T600 IMSA GTP car he won the first race at Laguna Seca and went on to win the IMSA Camel GTP championship. His last year of professional racing was at the age of 52, driving for the works Aston Martin team in the 1989 World Sports Prototype Championship.  He later co-managed the Redman Bright racing team.

Redman has now taken out his 61st racing licence, lives in Florida and is active in historic racing.

Legacy
Road America hosts The WeatherTech International Challenge with Brian Redman for vintage/historic cars, one of the largest and most prestigious vintage racing events in the US
Redman is inducted in the following Halls of Fame: Daytona International Hall of Fame, Sebring Hall of Fame, Talladega Hall of Fame, Motor Sport Hall of Fame (UK), Long Beach Pavement of Fame.

Racing record

Complete British Saloon Car Championship results
(key) (Races in bold indicate pole position; races in italics indicate fastest lap.)

† Events with 2 races staged for the different classes.

Complete European Formula Two Championship results
(key)

Complete Formula One World Championship results
(key)

Non-Championship Formula One results
(key)

Complete 24 Hours of Le Mans results

References

External links
"Porsche experience" interview of Brian Redman
"Targa 66 club" started by Brian Redman

English racing drivers
English Formula One drivers
Cooper Formula One drivers
Rob Walker Racing Team Formula One drivers
Williams Formula One drivers
Surtees Formula One drivers
McLaren Formula One drivers
BRM Formula One drivers
Shadow Formula One drivers
European Formula Two Championship drivers
International Race of Champions drivers
People educated at Rossall School
People from Colne
1937 births
Living people
24 Hours of Le Mans drivers
24 Hours of Daytona drivers
IMSA GT Championship drivers
World Sportscar Championship drivers
12 Hours of Sebring drivers
People from Highland Park, Illinois
Porsche Motorsports drivers
BMW M drivers
Jaguar Racing drivers
Ecurie Ecosse drivers
Team Penske drivers